The 2019 Tour de France was the 106th edition of Tour de France, one of cycling's Grand Tours. The Tour began in Brussels, Belgium, with a flat stage on 6 July, and Stage 12 occurred on 18 July with a mountainous stage from Toulouse. The race finished on the Champs-Élysées in Paris on 28 July.

Classification standings

Stage 12
18 July 2019 - Toulouse to Bagnères-de-Bigorre, 

After various attacks from the start of the race, a large breakaway group eventually established itself, achieving a lead of two minutes. From the breakaway group, Peter Sagan won the intermediate sprint at Bagnères-de-Luchon. Simon Clarke then went ahead, gaining a 40-second advantage on the descent. Simon Yates and Gregor Mühlberger led the race over the summit, with Pello Bilbao a short distance behind. The lead group of three riders then stayed together to the finish, with Yates winning the sprint.

Stage 13
19 July 2019 - Pau to Pau,  (ITT)

The riders departed at one-minute intervals from 14:00 CET, with the final 35 riders departing at two-minute intervals between 16:11 and 17:19 CET.

Kasper Asgreen set a leading time of 35' 52", from early on. Wout van Aert was hopeful of taking the best time, before he cornered and crashed into a barrier, forcing his abandonment of the race in the last . Thomas De Gendt then set a new leading time of 35' 36". Geraint Thomas then improved upon De Gendt's time, before Julian Alaphilippe bettered Thomas' result.

Stage 14
20 July 2019 - Tarbes to Col du Tourmalet, 

Tim Wellens, Vincenzo Nibali and Élie Gesbert led up the climb, with Wellens leading over the summit. On the approach to the hors catégorie Col du Tourmalet, Romain Sicard was at the head of the race, 30 seconds in front of Gesbert and Lilian Calmejane. With  remaining, Geraint Thomas got detached from the lead group containing Alaphilippe, Buchmann, Pinot, Bernal, Landa and Kruijswijk.

Stage 15
21 July 2019 - Limoux to Foix (Prat d'Albis), 

A lead group of 28 riders established itself by the Col de Montségur. The lead group was reduced to 16 riders on the climb of the Port de Lers. Simon Geschke attacked on the climb of the Mur de Péguère, with Simon Yates soon following. Yates caught Geschke at the summit, both 20 seconds ahead of the lead group. With  to race, Yates attacked, holding a lead to the finish.

Rest day 2
22 July 2019 - Nîmes

Wilco Kelderman of Team Sunweb announced that he was abandoning the race and would not start stage 16.

Stage 16
23 July 2019 - Nîmes to Nîmes, 

A five-man breakaway group established itself early in the race, gaining a lead of around two minutes. With  to race, Geraint Thomas crashed but was able to recover, later claiming that his bike's gears had jammed.

Stage 17
24 July 2019 - Pont du Gard to Gap, 

A large breakaway group of 33 riders quickly became established. As there were no general classification contenders in the breakaway group, the peloton decided to conserve energy, instead of pursuing the group. The breakaway group's lead stretched out to 15 minutes, with  still to race. Towards the end of the final climb, Matteo Trentin attacked from the breakaway group and held on to take the stage. Luke Rowe and Tony Martin were both disqualified from the Tour, following an altercation near the front of the peloton, in the latter part of the stage.

Stage 18
25 July 2019 - Embrun to Valloire, 

A group of more than thirty riders went ahead after  of racing, gaining a four-minute lead on the approach to the Col de Vars. Tim Wellens led the group over the first climb, with the lead now extended to seven minutes over the peloton. Greg Van Avermaet and Julien Bernard went ahead of the lead group on the approach to the Col d'Izoard. Bernard then led alone on the climb but was caught before the summit, with Damiano Caruso leading a small group over the top. An eleven-rider group reformed at the foot of the climb to the Col du Galibier, which had a five-minute advantage over the peloton. On the Galibier, Nairo Quintana attacked with  still to climb, leading by over a minute and a half at the summit, which he held on the descent to the finish. Meanwhile, with  still to climb of the Galibier, Egan Bernal attacked from within the yellow jersey group containing Alaphilippe and Thomas, allowing Bernal to recover half a minute on the other general classification contenders by the finish.

Stage 19
26 July 2019 - Saint-Jean-de-Maurienne to Tignes Col de l'Iseran,  

Around  into the stage, Thibaut Pinot, who had been sitting fifth overall in the general classification and was noticeably struggling to deal with the pain of a muscle tear in his left thigh from the previous day, abandoned the race in tears after being unable to continue to ride with the pain.

The Souvenir Henri Desgrange was given to Egan Bernal, who was the first rider to summit the Col de l'Iseran, the highest climb of this race. As the riders began the descent of the Col de l'Iseran, the stage was neutralised due to snow, hailstorms, and mudslides rendering the road unsafe near Val-d'Isère on the ascent to Tignes, with times for the general classification being taken at the summit of the Col de l'Iseran. As a result, Bernal, who had been in second place, moved ahead of Julian Alaphilippe, who was nearly two minutes behind Bernal at the summit, and took the lead in that classification. Due to the neutralisation, there was no official winner of the stage, and the usual stage finish time bonuses of 10, 6, and 4 seconds for the first three finishers respectively were also not awarded. However, the special time bonuses of 8, 5, and 2 seconds on offer at the summit of the Col de l'Iseran were still awarded to the first three riders respectively to reach the summit.

Stage 20
27 July 2019 - Albertville to Val Thorens,  

The weather that caused the neutralisation of the previous stage also affected the route of this stage, with mudslides that rendered the descent off the Cormet de Roselend unusable. All sporting points and time bonuses from the diverted route were withdrawn, leaving only those given on top of Val Thorens.

As the race travelled through the valley from Albertville to Moûtiers, a group of more than twenty riders established a two and a half minute lead over the peloton. On beginning the climb to Val Thorens, the lead group was reduced to four riders, with a further two riders then joining. With  until the finish, Vincenzo Nibali attacked from the lead group. Nibali then held a lead to the finish line.

Stage 21
28 July 2019 - Rambouillet to Paris (Champs-Élysées), 

With  still to race, after the peloton had completed a lap of the usual Champs-Élysées circuit, a four-man group comprising Jan Tratnik, Nils Politt, Omar Fraile and Tom Scully achieved a lead of over twenty seconds on the peloton. The peloton then headed the race into the finish. Edvald Boasson Hagen opened the sprint in the final , before being passed by Maximiliano Richeze and Niccolò Bonifazio. Dylan Groenewegen and Caleb Ewan then took opposite sides of the road, to pass the other riders.

Notes

References

Sources
 

2019 Tour de France
Tour de France stages